Duarte de Menezes may refer to:

 Duarte de Menezes, 3rd Count of Viana (d.1464), first Portuguese captain of Alcácer-Ceguer.
 Duarte de Menezes (fl.1520), captain of Tangier and 5th governor of Portuguese India 
 Duarte de Menezes, 14th Viceroy of India (d.1588)